Brucella pseudintermedia is a gram-negative, non-spore-forming, motile bacteria from the genus of Brucella with a subpolar flagella which was isolated from human axillary swab in Montpellier in France.

References

External links
Type strain of Ochrobactrum pseudintermedium at BacDive -  the Bacterial Diversity Metadatabase

Hyphomicrobiales
Bacteria described in 2007